Christopher John Raymond Garrett FRS, FRSC (born 1943 Bude) is a British oceanographer, and Lansdowne Professor of Ocean Physics, at University of Victoria. He was a 1981 Guggenheim Fellow.

Education
He earned a B.A. in 1965, and Ph.D. in 1968 from University of Cambridge.

Career and research
He was executive committee member at Centre for Asia-Pacific Initiatives.

Awards and honours
He was elected a Fellow of the Royal Society in 1993.

Personal life
Dr. Garrett is now retired.

References

1943 births
Living people
People from Bude
British oceanographers
Fellows of the Royal Society
Fellows of the Royal Society of Canada
Academic staff of the University of Victoria
Alumni of the University of Cambridge
Foreign associates of the National Academy of Sciences